Victoria Legal Aid (VLA), formerly the Legal Aid Commission of Victoria, is an organisation that provides information, legal advice and education with a focus on the prevention and early resolution of legal problems.

They prioritise intensive legal services, such as legal advice and representation, to those who need it the most. They also recognise the connections between legal and social issues and advocate for change.

As a statutory authority, VLA operates under the Legal Aid Act 1978 and is funded by the Australian Government for matters that fall under Commonwealth law, and the Victorian state government. The majority of Commonwealth law matters fall within the family law jurisdiction. Another source of funding is from the public purpose fund, made up of interest paid on money that is collected by the Legal Services Board from solicitors' trust accounts.

VLA also administers Commonwealth and state government funding of Community Legal Centres within Victoria. Community legal centres (CLCs) are independent community organisations that provide free advice, casework and legal education to their communities. VLA administers funding for the majority of CLCs in Victoria and the Federation of Community Legal Centres through the CLC Funding Program, ensuring that centres meet their service agreements. It also focuses on supporting the professional development of the sector through joint training initiatives.

, Louise Glanville is CEO.

History
The idea of legal aid is more than 100 years old in Victoria.

Before 1928 only prisoners or very poor people could apply to the Supreme Court for legal aid. In 1928 the government set up the Public Solicitor's Office to make legal aid more easily available. People were eligible if they did not own property worth more than 50 pounds. As more people learnt about legal aid, demand increased. This created a backlog of cases in the Public Solicitor's Office. To provide more legal aid, the Victorian state government passed the Legal Aid Act 1961 which set up the Legal Aid Committee. This committee was run by the legal profession.

In 1969, the state government passed new legislation. This Act made the Legal Aid Committee responsible for civil and minor criminal cases, and made the Public Solicitor responsible for serious criminal cases. In 1974 the Commonwealth government set up the Australian Legal Aid Office. This office provided legal aid for Federal law cases such as family law and bankruptcy. The Australian Legal Aid Office also helped people who the commonwealth had a special responsibility for, such as people receiving social security and members of the armed forces.

The Legal Aid Commission of Victoria (LACV) was set up in 1978 as an independent statutory body. The LACV took over the functions of the Australian Legal Aid Office, the Legal Aid Committee and the Public Solicitor's Office. The LACV had a wider role than the Legal Aid Committee and the Public Solicitor's Office. Its role included providing community legal education and law reform. The LACV had an 11-member board including representatives from community legal centres, welfare groups and the legal profession.

Victoria Legal Aid replaced the LACV in December 1995.

Structure
VLA has a board of directors, a chief executive officer, three large in-house legal practice directorates, an in-house advocacy team, and legal and corporate support functions.

The Board is responsible for ensuring Victoria Legal Aid meets its statutory objectives and carries out its functions and duties in accordance with the Legal Aid Act 1978. It has a Chairperson and six directors nominated by the Victorian Attorney-General and appointed by the Governor-in-Council. At least one member must have experience in financial management; at least one must have experience in public management; at least one must have experience with criminal proceedings (either as a legal practitioner or a judicial officer)  and at least one must have experience in other areas of legal practice engaged in by Victoria Legal Aid or its officers. When the position of Managing Director at VLA was changed to Chief Executive Officer in November 2018, there was a vacancy on the Board. This position has since been filled by Andrew Saunders. The Chief Executive Officer cannot be appointed to the Board.

Current programs and objectives

Civil Justice Program
Victoria Legal Aid's work in civil law aims to contribute to a more inclusive and rights-respecting community. They help people with social security, mental health, guardianship and administration, infringements, immigration, tenancy, debt, discrimination, sexual harassment and victims of crime issues.

Criminal Law Program
Victoria Legal Aid assist people charged with criminal offences and endeavour to positively influence the criminal justice system to:

– provide timely justice, the fair hearing of charges and appropriate outcomes

– ensure people charged with offences are treated fairly and are well-informed about their options

– improve understanding of criminal justice and how to best address the causes of criminal offending and keep the community safe.

Family, Youth and Children's Law Program
Victoria Legal Aid assist people to resolve their family disputes to achieve safe, workable and child-focused parenting and care arrangements. They also assist parents to build their capacity to resolve future disputes without legal assistance. They contribute to the safety of adults and children affected by family violence and assist in reducing the incidence of family violence by providing legal information, advice and representation.

VLA Chambers
Victoria Legal Aid maintains an in-house advocacy practice to ensure it has thorough and practical knowledge of the needs and challenges of jurisdictions in which legal aid services are provided. The primary function of Victoria Legal Aid Chambers (Chambers) is to provide high quality advocacy for legally aided clients in civil, criminal and family, youth and children’s law matters and to conduct strategic litigation to remedy a legal problem or change a policy or process to benefit an individual client and the broader community.

See also
 Legal aid in Australia
 Consumer Action Law Centre, funded in part by Victoria Legal Aid

References

External links

 Victoria Legal Aid
 National Legal Aid
 Legal Aid ACT
 Legal Aid New South Wales
 Legal Aid Queensland
 Legal Aid Western Australia
 Northern Territory Legal Aid Commission
 Legal Aid Commission of Tasmania
 Legal Aid Commission of South Australia
 Legal Aid Act 1978 (Vic)
 Legal Services Board of Victoria
 Victorian Legal Assistance Forum
 Federation of Community Legal Centres Victoria

Legal aid
Victoria (Australia) law
Organisations based in Victoria (Australia)
Government agencies of Victoria (Australia)
Government agencies established in 1995